Eric de Koeyer (born 22 February 1967) is a retired Dutch football goalkeeper.

References

1967 births
Living people
Dutch footballers
K.S.C. Lokeren Oost-Vlaanderen players
R.E. Mouscron players
K.V. Kortrijk players
Association football goalkeepers
Belgian Pro League players
Dutch expatriate footballers
Expatriate footballers in Belgium
Dutch expatriate sportspeople in Belgium